L-lysine cyclodeaminase (EC 4.3.1.28, rapL (gene), fkbL (gene), tubZ (gene), visC (gene)) is an enzyme with systematic name L-lysine ammonia-lyase (cyclizing; ammonia-forming). This enzyme catalyses the following chemical reaction

 Llysine  L-pipecolate + NH3

This enzyme requires bound NAD+.

References

External links 
 

EC 4.3.1